Matadero (English: Slaughterhouse) is a Spanish black comedy–crime drama limited television series created by Daniel Martín Sáez de Parayuelo and produced by Diagonal TV for Atresmedia. It premiered on Antena 3 on January 9, 2019 and ended on March 13, 2019

Premise
In the small Castilian-Leonese town of Torrecillas, meat-processing businessman Francisco (Antonio Garrido) imports cheap and low-quality pigs from Portugal, some of which are used to smuggle cocaine. The veterinarian in his slaughterhouse is his brother-in-law Alfonso (Pepe Viyuela), a weak-willed man who is fed up of being blackmailed to look the other way and certify animals of dubious quality.

When Francisco's lover Coral organises the theft of the latest consignment of drug-smuggling pigs, she sets in motion a violent series of events. This entangles Pascual and Teo, a Murcian-Galician hitman duo, Vasco, a vengeful Portuguese gangster, Maria, Francisco's niece and a member of the Guardia Civil - and above all, Almudena, Francisco's wife, along with the hapless Alfonso.

Elsewhere, Alfonso's wife María José gets promoted in her sales company, under the watchful eye of her smarmy boss, Fermín, and Salvador, a local pig farmer and rival of Francisco's, seeks to win the heart of Almudena, the woman whom he has always loved,

Cast
 Pepe Viyuela as Alfonso Cubillo
 Carmen Ruiz as María José Jiménez – Alfonso's wife
 Camila Viyuela as María Cubillo – Alfonso's daughter and a Guardia Civil
 Iván Cózar as Nuño – María's fiancé
 Antonio Garrido as Francisco
 Lucía Quintana as Almudena Jiménez – Francisco's wife
 Eduardo Antuña as Herminio – Francisco's employee
 Merjoddy Bermúdez as Coral – Francisco's lover
 José Ángel Egido as Don Julio – head of a Galician drug cartel
 Ginés García Millán as Pascual – a hitman working for Don Julio
  as Teo – Pascual's partner
  as Da Silva – a Portuguese drug lord
 Filipe Duarte as Vasco – a Portuguese gangster working for Da Silva
  as Fermín – María José's employer
 Tito Valverde as Salvador – a local farmer and rival of Francisco's
  as Teresa – Salvador's wife
 Franky Martín as Ricardo – Salvador's son
  as Capitán Villanueva – the head of the Guardia Civil
 Pep Ambrós as Jacobo – a member of the National Police Corps who grows close to María

Episodes

Season 1 (2019)

References

External links
 
 

2010s crime drama television series
2010s black comedy television series
2019 Spanish television series debuts
2019 Spanish television series endings
Antena 3 (Spanish TV channel) network series
Crime thriller television series
Spanish crime television series
Spanish-language television shows
Television shows set in Castile and León
2010s Spanish drama television series
2010s Spanish comedy television series
Spanish thriller television series
Television series by Diagonal TV